Aigur  is a village in the southern state of Karnataka, India. It is located in the Somvarpet taluk of Kodagu district.

See also
 Kodagu
 Districts of Karnataka

References

External links

Villages in Kodagu district